Heroes of the Environment is a list published in Time magazine. The inaugural list was published in October 2007. The list contains 43 entries, individuals or groups that have contributed substantially to the preservation of environment, and is divided into four categories: Leaders & Visionaries, Activists, Scientists & Innovators, and Moguls & Entrepreneurs.

The list has been commented and discussed worldwide, in newspapers or by organizations.

Leaders & Visionaries

Mikhail Gorbachev
David Attenborough
Lee Myung Bak
Al Gore
Janine Benyus
Tommy Remengesau
José Goldemberg
Prince Charles
James Lovelock
Robert Redford
David Suzuki
Barnabas Suebu
Angela Merkel

Activists

Frederic Hauge
Wang Canfa
Olga Tsepilova
Von Hernandez
Wangari Maathai
Christine Loh
Benjamin Kahn
Karl Ammann
Hammer Simwinga

Scientists & Innovators

Toyota Prius Design Team
Tim Flannery
Theo Colborn
Chip Giller
James E. Hansen
D.P. Dobhal
Norman Myers
Paul Crutzen
Abul Hussam
George Schaller

Moguls & Entrepreneurs

Tulsi Tanti
Kazutoshi Sakurai and Takeshi Kobayashi
Jeffrey Immelt
Amory B. Lovins
Ray Anderson
Richard Sandor
William McDonough and Michael Braungart
Shi Zhengrong

Richard Branson
Kristine Pearson and Rory Stear of Lifeline Energy

See also
Environmental Media Awards
Global 500 Roll of Honour
Global Environmental Citizen Award
Goldman Environmental Prize
Grantham Prize for Excellence in Reporting on the Environment
Tyler Prize for Environmental Achievement
Nuclear-Free Future Award

References

Environmental awards
Time (magazine)
Awards by magazines
Culture and the environment
2007 awards
2007 in the environment